Your Show of Shows is a live 90-minute variety show that was broadcast weekly in the United States on NBC from February 25, 1950, through June 5, 1954, featuring Sid Caesar and Imogene Coca. Other featured performers were Carl Reiner, Howard Morris, Bill Hayes, baritone singer Jack Russell, Judy Johnson, the Hamilton Trio and the soprano Marguerite Piazza. José Ferrer made several guest appearances on the series.

The show has been featured in several lists of the greatest television series. Most of the series has been preserved to some extent, but only some sketches have been released on home video.

Production
The 90-minute live series was produced by Sylvester "Pat" Weaver and directed by Max Liebman, who had been producing musical revues at the Tamiment resort in the Pocono Mountains for many years prior. Caesar, Coca, and Liebman had worked on Admiral Broadway Revue from January to June 1949. The series originated as the second half of a two-hour umbrella show, Saturday Night Review, with the first portion hosted by comedian Jack Carter in Chicago, Illinois, and the remainder telecast from the since-demolished International Theatre (also known as the Park Theatre) at 5 Columbus Circle and the Center Theatre in Manhattan, New York City. The Chicago portion was dropped at the end of the 1950–51 season, and the series became the 90-minute Your Show of Shows.

Writers for the series included Mel Brooks, Neil Simon, Danny Simon, Mel Tolkin, Lucille Kallen, Selma Diamond, Joseph Stein, Michael Stewart, Tony Webster (the only Gentile among the show's writers), and Carl Reiner who, though a cast member, also worked with the writers. The series is historically significant for the evolution of the variety genre by incorporating situation comedies (sitcoms) such as the running sketch "The Hickenloopers"; this added a narrative element to the traditional multi-act structure.

As author Ted Sennett described, stars Caesar, Coca, Carl Reiner, and Howard Morris

Coca recalled,
{{blockquote|There was a special chemistry to Your Show of Shows, I think, because [producer-director] Max [Liebman] wasn't afraid to throw out material at the last minute. And I think when you do live television — well, we stopped for nothing. We had no cue cards, no TelePrompTers, and no ad-libbing on the air, because Max would have died if anybody had ad-libbed. It would have been utter disgrace, and you would have been drummed right out of the corps. ... Nobody ever forgot a line, and that was the amazing part of it.<ref>Coca, Imogene, "Coca on Coca, as told to Linda Gutstein, in Fireman, p. 172.</ref>}}

A common misconception is that Larry Gelbart wrote for Your Show of Shows; in fact, he wrote for its successor program, Caesar's Hour, which was broadcast from 1954 to 1957. Likewise, Woody Allen did not write for Your Show of Shows, as he worked only on several Sid Caesar TV series and specials from 1958 forward.

Carl Reiner has stated that the time he spent on Your Show of Shows was the inspiration for The Dick Van Dyke Show. Your Show of Shows also inspired the 1982 movie My Favorite Year, produced by Mel Brooks, and the 1993 play Laughter on the 23rd Floor written by Neil Simon.

The series was noted for its array of glamorous dancers, including Joy Langstaff, Pauline Goddard, and Virginia Curtis.

By the 1953–1954 season, although the ratings had slipped a little, "Your Show of Shows" remained extremely popular with viewers. However, in the spring of 1954, it was decided to break up the comedy team of Caesar and Coca and, beginning in the fall of 1954, sign them to star in their own individual variety series on NBC. As a result, "Your Show Of Shows' ended its network run on June 5, 1954. At the end of that episode, NBC president "Pat" Weaver came out at the curtain call to congratulate the cast on their four-year-four-month run and personally to wish Caesar and Coca great success in their future endeavors.

The summer replacement for Your Show of Shows in 1953 and 1954 was Saturday Night Review.

 Sketches 
The show featured several regular musical sketches, such as the mock rock group The Haircuts which achieved a surprise novelty hit with "Going Crazy" in 1955.Elaine Colton The Newport Girls: A Memoir 2010  Page 8 "We brought down the house with our pantomime and lip-synching to “You Are So Rare to Me” and “Going Crazy (bahbadobabado),” made famous on Your Show of Shows by The Haircuts; Sid Caesar, Carl Reiner, and Howard Morris."Billboard - 11 Feb 1956 - Page 32 "The jock played Sid Caesar's satirical rock and roll platter "Going Crazy" by the Haircuts over and over and asked for contribution.' to stop the record. Then after a substantial contribution was offered, he asked for a higher bid to hear the disk ..."

Preservation
The kinescopes of the series were retained by Max Liebman; from those shows, a 1973 theatrical film titled Ten from Your Show of Shows was compiled which featured ten sketches. In 1976, this was followed by a half-hour syndicated series.

The Paley Center for Media in Manhattan and Beverly Hills, California, holds an almost complete set of the series, and a set of master tapes of the 1976 syndicated series.

In 2000, a cache of original scripts from the show were found in a closet of producer Max Liebman, in the City Center building in New York City. The find made the front page of The New York Times. A former employee of Liebman, Barry Jacobsen, told The New York Times he had left the scripts in the closet and was holding onto the key, planning to come back and retrieve them once City Center decided what to do with the papers; he was never contacted by City Center, and the scripts stayed in the closet until being found in 2000.

After the program ended the Caesar-Coca team was effectively split into two successor programs the following season: Imogene Coca starred in The Imogene Coca Show (which lasted one season), and Sid Caesar starred in Caesar's Hour, which retained much of the cast and staff of Your Show of Shows.

Syndication and DVD release
Reruns of the 1976 syndicated "best of" series were aired on Comedy Central during the early 1990s. Skits from the series which are from Sid Caesar's personal collection are available on The Sid Caesar Collection DVD set.

Reception

 Peak ratings 
1950–1951: #4
1951–1952: #8
1952–1953: #19

 Best-of lists 
In 2002, Your Show of Shows was ranked #30 on TV Guides 50 Greatest TV Shows of All Time. In 2013, it was ranked #37 on TV Guides 60 Best Series of All Time. In 2007, Time placed Your Show of Shows on its unranked list of "100 Best TV Shows of All-TIME." In 2013, Your Show of Shows was ranked #10 on Entertainment Weekly’s Top 100 Greatest TV Shows of All Time. In 2013, the Writers Guild of America ranked Your Show of Shows'' #41 on its list of the "101 Best Written TV Series of All Time."

References

External links

Ten From Your Show of Shows (1973) at IMDB
The Sid Caesar Collection
 
George Bonnell collection of Your Show of Shows scripts, 1950, held by the Billy Rose Theatre Division, New York Public Library for the Performing Arts

1950 American television series debuts
1954 American television series endings
1950s American sketch comedy television series
1950s American variety television series
Black-and-white American television shows
English-language television shows
American live television series
NBC original programming
Primetime Emmy Award for Outstanding Variety Series winners
Television shows filmed in New York City